Bighorn Peak is located in the Bighorn Mountains in the U.S. state of Wyoming. The peak is the seventh highest in the range and it is in the Cloud Peak Wilderness of Bighorn National Forest.

References

Mountains of Johnson County, Wyoming
Mountains of Wyoming
Bighorn National Forest